

Best-of-three games series 
1946–47 Wilkes-Barre Barons d. Lancaster Red Roses 2-1  
1947–48 Reading Keys d. Hazleton Mountaineers 2-1  
1948–49 Pottsville Packers d. Harrisburg Senators 2-1  
1949–50 Williamsport Billies d. Harrisburg Senators 2-1  
1950–51 Sunbury Mercuries d. York Victory A.C. 2-0  
1951–52 Pottsville Packers d.  Sunbury Mercuries 2-1  
1952–53 Williamsport Billies d. Berwick Carbuilders 2-1  
1953–54 Williamsport Billies d.  Lancaster Red Roses 2-1  
1954–55 Wilkes-Barre Barons d.  Hazelton Hawks 2-1  
1955–56 Wilkes-Barre Barons d.  Williamsport Billies 3-1  
1956–57 Scranton Miners d.  Hazelton Hawks 2-1  
1957–58 Wilkes-Barre Barons d.  Easton Madisons 2-1  
1958–59 Wilkes-Barre Barons d.  Scranton Miners 2-1  
1959–60 Easton Madisons d.  Baltimore Bullets 2-1  
1960–61 Baltimore Bullets d.  Allentown Jets 1-0  
1961–62 Allentown Jets d. Williamsport Billies 2-1  
1962–63 Allentown Jets d.  Wilkes-Barre Barons 2-1  
1963–64 Camden Bullets d.  Trenton Colonials 2-0  
1964–65 Allentown Jets d. Scranton Miners 2-1  
1965–66 Wilmington Blue Bombers d. Wilkes-Barre Barons 2-1  
1966–67 Wilmington Blue Bombers d. Scranton Miners 2-1

Best-of-five games series 
1967–68 Allentown Jets d. Wilkes-Barre Barons 3-2  
1968–69 Wilkes-Barre Barons d. Wilmington Blue Bombers 3-2 
1969–70 Allentown Jets d. Wilmington Blue Bombers 3-2 
1970–71 Scranton Apollos d. Hamden Bics 3-1  
1971–72 Allentown Jets d. Scranton Apollos 3-2  
1972–73 Wilkes-Barre Barons d.  Hartford Capitols 3-2  
1973–74 Hartford Capitols d. Allentown Jets 3-2  
1974–75 Allentown Jets d. Hazelton Bullets 2-1  
1975–76 Allentown Jets d. Lancaster Red Roses 3-2 
1976–77 Scranton Apollos d. Allentown Jets 3-1 
1977–78 Wilkes-Barre Barons d. Lancaster Red Roses 3-2

Best-of-seven games series 
1978–79 Rochester Zeniths d. Anchorage Northern Knights 4-0 
1979–80 Anchorage Northern Knights d. Rochester Zeniths 4-3 
1980–81 Rochester Zeniths d. Montana Golden Nuggets 4-0 
1981–82 Lancaster Lightning  d. Billings Volcanos 4-1 
1982–83 Detroit Spirits d. Montana Golden Nuggets 4-3 
1983–84 Albany Patroons d. Wyoming Wildcatters 3-2 
1984–85 Tampa Bay Thrillers d. Detroit Spirits 4-3 
1985–86 Tampa Bay Thrillers d. La Crosse Catbirds 4-1 
1986–87 Rapid City Thrillers d. Rockford Lightning 4-1 
1987–88 Albany Patroons d. Wyoming Wildcatters 4-3 
1988–89 Tulsa Fast Breakers d. Rockford Lightning 4-0 
1989–90 La Crosse Catbirds d. Rapid City Thrillers 4-1 
1990–91 Wichita Falls Texans d. Quad City Thunder 4-3 
1991–92 La Crosse Catbirds d. Rapid City Thrillers 4-3 
1992–93 Omaha Racers d. Grand Rapids Hoops 4-2 
1993–94 Quad City Thunder d. Omaha Racers 4-1 
1994–95 Yakima Sun Kings d. Pittsburgh Piranhas 4-2 
1995–96 Sioux Falls Skyforce d. Fort Wayne Fury 4-1 
1996–97 Oklahoma City Cavalry d. Florida Beach Dogs 4-2 
1997–98 Quad City Thunder d. Sioux Falls Skyforce 4-3 
1998–99 Connecticut Pride d. Sioux Falls Skyforce 4-1

Championship game 
1999–2000 Yakima Sun Kings 109, La Crosse Bobcats 93 
2000–2001 Idaho Stampede (17–7) and Connecticut Pride (15–9) led their divisions when the league suspended operations.
2001–2002 Dakota Wizards 116, Rockford Lightning 109 
2002–2003 Yakima Sun Kings 117, Grand Rapids Hoops 107
2003–2004 Dakota Wizards 132, Idaho Stampede 129

Best-of-five games series 
2004–2005 Sioux Falls Skyforce d. Rockford Lightning 3-1

Best-of-three games series 
2005–2006 Yakama Sun Kings d. Gary Steelheads 2-1

Best-of-five games series 
2006–2007 Yakama Sun Kings d. Albany Patroons 3-0
2007–2008 Oklahoma Cavalry d. Minot Skyrockets 3-2

Best-of-three games series 
2008–2009 Lawton-Fort Sill Cavalry d. Albany Patroons 2-1

See also 
 Continental Basketball Association
 Continental Basketball Association franchise history
 List of Continental Basketball Association All-Star Games
 List of Continental Basketball Association MVP's and Notable Alumni
 List of developmental and minor sports leagues

Champions